Natasha Jonas (born 18 June 1984) is a British professional boxer who has held the WBO female junior-middleweight title since February 2022. Since September 3rd 2022 she has held the WBC female super-welterweight title. Since November 12th 2022 she held the IBF Light middleweight title. an amateur, she won a bronze medal in the lightweight division at the 2012 AIBA World Championships; bronze in the light welterweight division at the 2011 European Championships; and silver in the light welterweight division at the 2014 European Championships.

Amateur career
Jonas took up boxing in 2005 and by 2010 she had won five ABA Championships in the 64 kg Division for Liverpool club Rotunda ABC. In 2009 she became the first female boxer to compete for GB Boxing. In the same year she claimed gold in the 64 kg division at the 2009 Women's European Union Amateur Boxing Championships in Pazardzhik, Bulgaria, after she overcame Csilla Csejtei of Hungary in the final. Jonas another gold medal in the inaugural GB Amateur Boxing Championships in 2010, when she pipped rival Amanda Coulson by one point in an exciting bout in front of her home fans at Liverpool's Echo Arena.

2012 AIBA Women's World Amateur Boxing Championships
Jonas made history in Qinhuangdao, China in May 2012, when she reached the semi-finals of the 2012 AIBA Women's World Boxing Championships to become the first ever female British boxer to qualify for an Olympic Games, she then went on to take the bronze medal and a place in the 2012 London Olympics back to Liverpool with her.

2012 Olympic Games
Jonas became the first ever British female boxer to compete at an Olympic Games. Jonas faced Quanitta Underwood of the United States in the round of 16, Jonas emphatically beat Underwood, 21:13 winning three of the four rounds boxed. Her wins set up a quarter-final bout with four-time World Champion, and Ireland's flag-bearer at the Opening Ceremony, Katie Taylor. Jonas lost heavily to Taylor 26:15.

Professional boxing record and awards

Natasha Jonas won the British Boxing Board of Control’s 2022 British Boxer of the Year award, which made her the first woman to win the British Boxing Board of Control's British Boxer of the Year Award.

Personal life
Initially intending to be a footballer, Jonas spent eighteen months at St. Peter's College in the United States on a football scholarship. After suffering an injury that ended her football career, she returned to the United Kingdom and studied media studies at Edge Hill University, Lancashire. She was employed for five years by Liverpool City Council and was a mentor for the Youth Sport Trust for four years, helping to promote sport and healthy lifestyles to school-age children.

Jonas is an older sister of footballer Nikita Parris.

In the media
In July 2012, Jonas appeared alongside Tom Stalker and James Dickens in Channel 4 documentary, Knockout Scousers, which followed her to Czech Republic and China on her pursuit for Olympic qualification, a production which she also narrated.

References

External links

Natasha Jonas (Official Website) natashajonas.co.uk
"Natasha Jonas’s weight of expectation", The Times, 16 August 2009
Natasha's exclusive training diary in the build up to London 2012 for Livefight

 

|-

|-

1984 births
Living people
English women boxers
Boxers from Liverpool
Black British sportswomen
Alumni of Edge Hill University
Boxers at the 2012 Summer Olympics
Olympic boxers of Great Britain
Boxers at the 2014 Commonwealth Games
Commonwealth Games competitors for England
AIBA Women's World Boxing Championships medalists
Southpaw boxers
Super-featherweight boxers
Lightweight boxers
World Boxing Organization champions
World Boxing Council champions
International Boxing Federation champions
The Ring (magazine) champions
World light-middleweight boxing champions